The NATO E band is a designation given to the radio frequencies from 2000 to 3 000 MHz (equivalent to wavelengths between 15 and 10 cm) during the cold war period. Since 1992 detailed frequency allocations, allotment and assignments are in line to NATO Joint Civil/Military Frequency Agreement (NJFA). However, in order to generically identify military radio spectrum requirements, e.g. for crises management planning, training, Electronic warfare activities, radar or in military operations, the Nato band system is often used.

References

Radio spectrum
Military equipment of NATO